Chloride channel protein 2 is a protein that in humans is encoded by the CLCN2 gene. Mutations of this gene have been found to cause leukoencephalopathy and Idiopathic generalised epilepsy, although the latter claim has been disputed. CLCN2 contains a transmembrane region that is involved in chloride ion transport as well two intracellular copies of the CBS domain.

See also 
 Chloride channel

References

Further reading

External links 
 
 

Ion channels